Samourais is a 2002 martial arts film starring Cyril Mourali, Jean-François Lénogue, Mai Anh Le and Yasuaki Kurata. It was directed by Giordano Gederlini and written by Matt Alexander and Alexandre Coquelle.

References

External links

2002 films
2002 action films
Martial arts films